Sour cherry commonly refers to cultivars of Prunus cerasus. It can also refer to:

 Prunus cerasoides
 Prunus pseudocerasus
 Syzygium corynanthum, a common Australian tree

See also
 Dwarf cherry
 Prunus emarginata, bitter cherry
 Prunus virginiana, choke cherry